WILW may refer to:

 WILW-LP, a low-power radio station (96.3 FM) licensed to serve Waupaca, Wisconsin, United States
 WIBG-FM, a New Jersey radio station that formerly had the callsign WILW
 Wil Wheaton (born 1972), an American actor prolific on Twitter with the username @wilw